Albert LeGatt is the Roman Catholic Archbishop of St. Boniface in the Province of Manitoba, Canada. He was appointed Archbishop by Pope Benedict XVI on July 3, 2009, and received the Pallium on June 29, 2010.

He was born on May 6, 1953, in Melfort, Saskatchewan, to Joseph and Emma LeGatt. Legatt studied at St. Boniface College (University of Manitoba), graduating in 1974 with his B.A. in Philosophy and French. Following graduation he served as a CUSO (Canadian University Services Overseas) volunteer in Ghana teaching French in a secondary school.

In 1977 he entered Le Grand Séminaire de Québec, and was ordained to the priesthood for the Diocese of Prince Albert on June 19, 1983, by Bishop Blaise Morand. For the next seventeen years (1983–2000) he served in a number of parishes in the diocese, as well as co-ordinator of the Diocesan Liturgical Commission, Director of Vocations and Consultor.

In 2000–2001 he pursued studies at the University of Notre Dame; and on October 5, 2001, he was consecrated as Bishop of Saskatoon in St. Patrick's Church by Bishop Morand, Archbishop James Hayes of Halifax and Archbishop Peter Mallon of Regina. He served the Diocese of Saskatoon for eight years until his appointment as Archbishop of St. Boniface in 2009.

LeGatt's Episcopal motto is Ut Unum Sint (Latin: That They May Be One) and is taken from Chapter 17, Verse 22 of The Gospel According to John.

He is Chairman of the Episcopal Commission for Liturgy and the Sacraments – English Sector for the Canadian Conference of Catholic Bishops and a Fourth Degree member of the Knights of Columbus.

External links 

 Archbishop LeGatt's biography on the archdiocesan website.
 Archbishop LeGatt's listing at www.catholic-hierarchy.org.
 News release from the Diocese of Saskatoon on the appointment of Archbishop LeGatt as Archbishop of St. Boniface.
 Catholic Register article on the appointment of Archbishop LeGatt to the Archdiocese of St. Boniface.

21st-century Roman Catholic archbishops in Canada
People from Melfort, Saskatchewan
Living people
1953 births
Roman Catholic bishops of Saskatoon
Roman Catholic archbishops of Saint Boniface